Edward Koster (14 September 1861 – 3 July 1937) was a Dutch writer. His work was part of the literature event art competition at the 1928 Summer Olympics.

References

External links
Digitale Bibliotheek voor de Nederlandse Letteren (DBNL): profile
Nordisk familjebok. Vol 14 - Kikarsikte - Kroma, pp. 1141–42. Uggleupplagan (1911) (digital version)

1861 births
1937 deaths
19th-century Dutch male writers
20th-century Dutch male writers
Olympic competitors in art competitions
People from London